Catherine Ceniza Choy (born April 9, 1969) is a Professor of Ethnic Studies at the University of California, Berkeley. Prior to working at UC Berkeley, she taught at the University of Minnesota in American Studies.

Biography
Choy received her Bachelor of Arts in History from Pomona College in 1991, where she graduated cum laude. Choy proceeded to finish her Master of Arts from UCLA in 1993, and then a Ph.D. in History from UCLA in 1998.

Books
In 2003, Choy published a book entitled Empire of Care: Nursing and Migration in Filipino American History, which was reviewed in the American Historical Review by Madeline Hsu. Empire of Care traces the history and migration of Filipino nurses. Choy uses the term "empire of care" to refer global inequalities in health services due to an inequitable distribution of healthcare providers around the world. She argues that international migration patterns of nurses only serve to exacerbate those inequalities.

In 2013, Choy's book Global Families: A History of Asian International Adoption in America was published. It was reviewed in the American Historical Review, Adoption Quarterly, the Journal of Asian American Studies, and The Journal of the History of Childhood and Youth.

Awards
Choy was awarded a Faculty Research Grant (2009–2010), a Mellon Project Grant (2008–2009), a Humanities Research Fellowship (2008–2009) and a Townsend Center for the Humanities Initiative Grant (2007) from UC Berkeley. For her book Empire of Care, she received the History Book Award from the Association for Asian American Studies in 2005, an honorable mention for the American Studies Association Lora Romero First Book Publication Prize in 2004, and the Book of the Year Award in History and Public Policy from the American Journal of Nursing in 2003. In 2005, she was given the honor of the Edith Kreeger Wolf Distinguished Visiting Professor from Northwestern University.

References

External links
Catherine Ceniza Choy Faculty Page
Ethnic Studies at UC Berkeley
Empire of Care
Global Families

University of California, Berkeley College of Letters and Science faculty
Pomona College alumni
University of California, Los Angeles alumni
Living people
American women academics
American women writers
Place of birth missing (living people)
1969 births
University of Minnesota faculty
21st-century American women